Chapter V: Unbent, Unbowed, Unbroken is the fifth studio album by the Swedish power metal band HammerFall, released in 2005 through Nuclear Blast. It features the track "Knights of the 21st Century", which includes guest vocals from Venom frontman Conrad "Cronos" Lant; it is also the band's longest studio recording to date with a length of 10:25, though after 1 minute and 40 seconds of silence, at 12:05, there is an outtake from Cronos.

The album's title was inspired by the family motto of the fictional House Martell of Dorne from the fantasy novel series A Song of Ice and Fire by George R. R. Martin, as were the names of the songs "Hammer of Justice", "Take the Black" and "Fury of the Wild". The lyric "Nothing burns like the cold" from "Never, Ever" is taken from the first chapter of A Game of Thrones, the first book in the series.

The cover artwork was created by Samwise Didier.

Track listing

Personnel
 Joacim Cans – lead vocals
 Oscar Dronjak – guitars, acoustic guitar on "Imperial", backing vocals, keyboard programming
 Stefan Elmgren – guitars, acoustic guitar on "Never, Ever", backing vocals
 Magnus Rosén – bass
 Anders Johansson  – drums

Additional musicians
 Conrad "Cronos" Lant (from Venom) – infernal voice on "Knights of the 21st Century"
 Patrick Benzer – keyboards; additional keyboard programming
 Martin Meyer – clavinet on "Secrets"
 Rolf Köhler, Olaf Zenkbiel, Mats Rendlert, Joacim Lundberg, Markus Sköld, Johan Aremyr – additional backing vocals

Charts

Release information
 "The Metal Age" was included as a bonus track on the Brazilian release.
 The album was also released as limited and numbered boxset (1,000 copies) containing the limited edition CD in a metal box, two HammerFall glasses, a HammerFall scarf and a certificate.
 The limited metal box CD is available separately (10,000 copies) and includes an enhanced part: "Blood Bound" (video clip) and Making of "Blood Bound" (video).
 The limited edition digipack includes an enhanced part: "Blood Bound" (video clip) and Picture Gallery, as well as a blue coin with the HammerFall logo on it.

References

External links
 Official HammerFall website

2005 albums
HammerFall albums
Nuclear Blast albums
Albums produced by Charlie Bauerfeind